

The Farman F.160 A.2 (sometimes referred only as the A.2 from the French military specification A = reconnaissance 2 = two-seater) was a 1920s French sesquiplane designed as a military reconnaissance and observation aircraft. Only one was built.

Development
The open-cockpit tandem two-seat sesquiplane was displayed at the 1924 Paris Salon de l'Aeronautique. It was designed to minimise drag and the wide-chord wing was faired into the top of the fuselage and the aircraft was carefully faired. The aircraft did not meet performance expectations and was scrapped, and the F.160 designation was reused for a biplane bomber developed from the Farman F.60 Goliath.

Specifications

References

Notes

Bibliography

1920s French military reconnaissance aircraft
A.2
Sesquiplanes